Benny Chastain (born September 22, 1942) is an American professional stock car racing driver. He last competed part-time in the ARCA Menards Series, driving the No. 01 Ford Fusion for Fast Track Racing.

Racing career

ARCA Menards Series 
Benny Chastain didn’t start racing until 1997, when he was 55 years old. After years of success at his local dirt track, he made his ARCA Menards Series debut in 2004 at South Boston Speedway. Chastain finished 22nd in his series debut. Chastain made starts over the next 12 years, never running full-time outside of 2006. In 2017, Chastain managed to lead a lap at Talladega Superspeedway, the only one of his career. His best finish to date is 15th in 2020 at Daytona International Speedway.

Motorsports career results

ARCA Menards Series

ARCA Menards Series East

References

External links 

1942 births
Living people
ARCA Menards Series drivers
NASCAR drivers
Racing drivers from Florida
Sportspeople from Tallahassee, Florida